Grace Mary Ellison (died 3 October 1935) was a British journalist. She wrote several books about Turkey. Though not herself a trained nurse, she was founder of the French Flag Nursing Corps during World War I.

Early life
Grace Mary Ellison was from Scotland, the daughter of Captain John Ellison. She credited her father's stories of sailing to India as inspiring her travelling career. She was educated in England at Rochester Girls' Grammar School, and in France, and at the University of Halle.

Career
Ellison was a journalist especially interested in Turkey. She befriended Turkish sisters Hadjidjé Zennour and Nouryé Neyr-el-Nissa, in 1905. Using their pseudonyms, she edited and co-wrote English-language books with them, Zeyneb Hanoum's A Turkish Woman’s European Impressions (1913, a memoir) and Melek Hanoum's Abdul Hamid's Daughter (1913, a novel). Whilst travelling in Turkey in 1908-1909 and 1912–1913, Ellison wrote articles for The Daily Telegraph. She advocated for women students to gain access to college classes in Constantinople. She was awarded the Order of Charity (Şefkat Nişanı) for her efforts on behalf of women in Turkey. She reported on the Second Hague Conference (1907) and was continental reporter for the Bystander.

In 1914, Grace Ellison worked with nurse Ethel Gordon Fenwick to create the French Flag Nursing Corps, coordinating the work of experienced nurses from the British Empire (including Canada, Australia, and New Zealand) with the French Medical Corps during World War I. The corps eventually became a program of the French Red Cross. Ellison fell seriously ill in 1917, and spent months recovering at a hospital in Bordeaux. The French government decorated Ellison for her wartime contributions.

After the war, she continued lectures in the United States on behalf of the French Ministry of War, matching French nurses to American nursing schools and expanding their opportunities for training at home. "I am convinced that the most important factor in social reconstruction today is the trained nurse," she explained. "No child welfare work can be done without trained nurses, and the whole future of France depends on what is done for her children." In 1922, she returned to Turkey to cover the Turkish War of Independence; in 1927, she was back in Ankara, reporting on the rapidly changing city.

Monographs by Ellison
 An Englishwoman in a Turkish Harem (1915)
 An Englishwoman in the French Firing Line (1915)
 An Englishwoman in Occupied Germany (1920)
 An Englishwoman in Angora (1923), 
 The Disadvantages of Being a Woman (1924)
 Turkey To-day (1928)
 Yugoslavia: A New Country and its People (1933)  
She also worked on three biographical projects: Prince Nicholas of Greece's memoirs (1923), a biography of Mustafa Kemal Atatürk (1930), and The Authorised Life Story of Princess Marina (1934).

Personal life
Grace Mary Ellison died in October 1935, in Berlin.

References

External links
 Precious McKenzie-Stearns, "On a Mission: Grace Ellison's 'An English Woman in a Turkish Harem'" (M. A. thesis, University of North Carolina at Wilmington 2003).
 The National Portrait Gallery (UK) holds one photograph of Grace Ellison, from 1928.

1935 deaths
Year of birth missing
British travel writers
British journalists
British women in World War I
British women travel writers